Syrnolopsis lacustris is a species of medium-sized freshwater snail with an operculum, an aquatic gastropod mollusk in the family Paludomidae. This species is found in Lake Tanganyika, which includes the countries of Burundi, the Democratic Republic of the Congo, Tanzania, and Zambia. The natural habitat of this species is freshwater lakes.

Syrnolopsis lacustris is the type species of the genus Syrnolopsis.

References

Paludomidae
Gastropods described in 1880
Taxa named by Edgar Albert Smith
Taxonomy articles created by Polbot